Tyvon A. Branch (born December 11, 1986) is a former American football safety. He was drafted by the Oakland Raiders in the fourth round (100th overall) of the 2008 NFL Draft and has also played for the Kansas City Chiefs and Arizona Cardinals. He played college football at Connecticut.

Professional career

Oakland Raiders
The Oakland Raiders selected Branch in the fourth round (100th overall) of the 2008 NFL Draft. The Raiders chose to draft Branch not only by his skills as a corner, but also his importance as a return specialist, due to the departure of all-time return leader Chris Carr. 
During his rookie season on September 14, 2008, Branch intercepted Kansas City Chiefs quarterback Damon Huard for his first career interception. Branch earned his first career start in the 2009 season opener on September 14 in a Monday night game against the San Diego Chargers, but was placed on season-ending injured reserve on November 5 with a shoulder injury.

He went on to have a breakout season for the Raiders in 2009 as the starting strong safety in all 16 games, finishing with 98 unassisted tackles and 26 assists, two forced fumbles, and a sack. He had his best game of the year in a win over the heavily favored Bengals with 12 tackles and a forced fumble. During the 2010 NFL season, he again started in all 16 games for an 8-8 team, recording 81 unassisted tackles and 23 assists.

In March 2012, the Raiders placed a franchise tag on Branch. On July 14, 2012, Branch signed a four-year, $26.6 million contract with the Raiders. On November 9, Branch was fined $15,750 for unnecessary roughness against the Tampa Bay Buccaneers.

Kansas City Chiefs
On March 10, 2015, Branch signed a one-year contract with the Kansas City Chiefs.

Arizona Cardinals
On March 9, 2016, Branch signed a two-year contract with the Arizona Cardinals worth $8 million with $5 million guaranteed until 2018. He was placed on injured reserve on October 4, 2016 with a groin injury. He was activated off injured reserve on December 2, 2016 prior to Week 13. He was placed back on injured reserve on December 13, 2016 after re-injuring his groin.

Branch entered the 2017 as the Cardinals' starting strong safety. During Thursday Night Football against the Seattle Seahawks on November 9, 2017, Branch suffered a torn ACL, ending his 2017 season.

NFL career statistics

References

External links

Kansas City Chiefs bio
Oakland Raiders bio
Tyvon Branch profile on ESPN.com

1986 births
Living people
Players of American football from Syracuse, New York
American football cornerbacks
American football safeties
American football return specialists
UConn Huskies football players
Oakland Raiders players
Kansas City Chiefs players
Arizona Cardinals players
Ed Block Courage Award recipients